Frances Makil-Ignacio is a Filipino actress (born March 29, 1971). From 2001-2012, she starred in numerous shows of ABS-CBN as a contract actress. In 2012, she briefly transferred to TV5 as part of Valiente before staging an ABS-CBN comeback the same year. She officially moved to GMA Network during 2013 where her career catapulted for playing the role of Mama Josie in Mundo Mo'y Akin, which won numerous award nominations. Ignacio later switched to freelance acting in 2015 but is mostly seen in GMA-7.

Filmography

Television

Movies

References

External links

Filipino film actresses
Living people
1971 births
Filipino television actresses